Acanthogobius flavimanus is a species of fish in the goby family known by the common name yellowfin goby. Other common names include mahaze, Japanese river goby, Oriental goby, and spotted goby. It is native to Asia, where its range includes China, Japan, Korea, parts of Russia, Vietnam, and Malaysia. It has spread beyond its native range to become an introduced, and often invasive, species. It has been recorded in Australia, Mexico, and Florida and California in the United States.

Description
This fish reaches  in length. It is light brown with darker saddle-marks and spots. The ventral fins are yellow. These fins are fused to form a cup. There are two dorsal fins. The species can be identified by the arrangement of pores on its head, the spines and rays in the dorsal fins, and the scales and papillae on the head and face. The yellow ventral fins also distinguish it from other gobies. The lifespan is generally up to 3 years, but some individuals may get older.

Biology
This fish spends most of the year in rivers and streams. During the winter it descends to more saline environments, such as bays and estuaries, where it breeds. There it is a bottom-dweller, living on the muddy or sandy beds. Spawning only occurs when the temperature is between about 7 °C and 13 °C (44.6 and 55.4 ºF). One fish may produce up to 37,000 eggs. Each egg is about 5.5 millimeters long. The nest may be guarded by both male and female. In optimal conditions the eggs hatch in about 28 days.

The fish tolerates fresh and saline waters, and rapid movements between them. It can live in a wide variety of water habitat types. The adult can spend its whole life in freshwater, but the larvae generally develop in saltwater.

The diet of the goby includes many kinds of small organisms, such as copepods, amphipods, mantis shrimp, mysids, small fish, and polychaetes. It has also been known to consume fly larvae, bivalves such as the Asian clam, ostracods, and various detritus. Natural predators of the goby include yellow goosefish (Lophius litulon), ocellate spot skate (Okamejei kenojei), Japanese whiting (Sillago japonica), leopard shark (Triakis semifasciata), ashishirohaze (Acanthogobius lactipes), and suzuki (Lateolabrax japonicus).

Fish of this species are often found to carry heavy parasite loads. They play host to the metacercariae of flukes, including Echinostoma hortense, Heterophyes nocens, Heterophyopsis continua, Pygidiopsis summa, Strictodora fuscata, S. lari, and Acanthotrema felis. These, particularly E. hortense, pose a risk to humans. People in Korea catch and eat the yellowfin goby raw, and often become infected with flukes. The fish is also host to the copepods Acanthochondria yui and Anchistrotos kojimensis, the latter of which was first described from a yellowfin goby specimen.

As an introduced species
A. flavimanus, the largest species of goby found in estuaries of California, was first discovered in the Sacramento-San Joaquin River system of California in 1963. It had probably been introduced a few years earlier, around the same time as the chameleon goby (Tridentiger trigonocephalus). It may have arrived in ballast water or as eggs on biofouling animals such as oysters on ship hulls. Anglers using the goby as bait in the local river system may have aided its dispersal. Now it is one of the most common bottom-dwelling fish in the rivers and the Delta, as well as San Francisco Bay. There it has become an important prey item for the harbor seal (Phoca vitulina). On the other hand, it has negative effects on the local ecosystem. It may compete with native fish such as the tidewater goby (Eucyclogobius newberryi). The fish was first encountered in Southern California in 1977, when it was found in Los Angeles Harbor; it was found in San Diego a few years later.

This fish is thought to have been introduced to Australia in ballast or on imported oysters. The species has been collected from the waters of New South Wales since 1971. It is a Class 1 noxious fish in the state, its sale or possession prohibited and punishable by fines.

Other uses
This species is sometimes kept in aquaria as an ornamental fish.

References

Gobionellinae
Taxa named by Coenraad Jacob Temminck
Taxa named by Hermann Schlegel
Fish described in 1845